Elisha Harris (September 8, 1791 – February 1, 1861) of Coventry, Kent County, Rhode Island, was Lieutenant Governor of Rhode Island, 1846–47 serving under Governor Byron Diman and the 20th Governor of Rhode Island 1847–49.

Biography
Harris was born in Cranston, Providence County, Rhode Island.  He attended the local schools and the East Greenwich Seminary.  He then embarked on a business career, working initially as a bookkeeper.  He eventually became an owner of several manufacturing companies, banks and other enterprises, including serving as President of the Bank of North America in Providence, and operating the Harris Mill in the Harris.

Active in politics as a Whig, Harris served several terms in the Rhode Island House of Representatives.  He served as lieutenant governor from 1846 until 1847.  In 1847 he became governor, and he served one term, 1847 to 1849.  He was an unsuccessful candidate for reelection in 1848, and for election as governor in 1850.  Harris became a Republican when the party was founded in the mid-1850s, and he was a presidential elector in 1860.

Harris died in Coventry and was buried at Greenwood Cemetery in Coventry.

Henry Howard, who also served as governor, was married to Harris's daughter Catherine.

References

External links

 
Elisha Harris at National Governors Association

|-

1791 births
1861 deaths
Governors of Rhode Island
Lieutenant Governors of Rhode Island
People from Coventry, Rhode Island
Politicians from Cranston, Rhode Island
Rhode Island Whigs
Rhode Island Republicans
Burials in Rhode Island
Whig Party state governors of the United States
19th-century American politicians